The Brantas is the longest river in  East Java, Indonesia. It has a length of 320 km, and drains an area over 11,000 km2 from the southern slope of Mount Kawi-Kelud-Butak, Mount Wilis, and the northern slopes of Mount Liman-Limas, Mount Welirang, and Mount Anjasmoro.  Its course is semi-circular or spiral in shape: at its source the river heads southeast, but gradually curves south, then southwest, then west, then north, and finally it flows generally eastward at the point where it branches off to become the Kalimas and Porong River.

History 

King Mpu Sindok moved his kingdom from Mataram Kingdom in Central Java to a new location on this river at circa 950 A.D. Possibly (only one of a number of reasons given) due to a Mount Merapi volcanic eruption, he had to leave his kingdom to this new safe place near present city of Madiun.

Cities and regencies on Brantas River 
 Batu
 Malang Regency
 Malang
 Blitar Regency
 Blitar
 Tulungagung Regency
 Kediri Regency
 Kediri
 Nganjuk Regency
 Jombang Regency
 Mojokerto Regency
 Mojokerto

Geography
The river flows in the eastern area of Java with predominantly tropical monsoon climate (designated as Am in the Köppen-Geiger climate classification). The annual average temperature in the area is 26 °C. The warmest month is October, when the average temperature is around 30 °C, and the coldest is June, at 24 °C. The average annual rainfall is 2982 mm. The wettest month is March, with an average of 496 mm rainfall, and the driest is August, with 28 mm rainfall.

See also
List of rivers of Indonesia
List of rivers of Java

References 

Rivers of East Java
Rivers of Indonesia